There have been two baronetcies created for people with the surname Mackintosh, both in the Baronetage of the United Kingdom. One creation is extant as of 2010.

The Mackintosh Baronetcy, of Mackintosh in the County of Glamorgan, was created in the Baronetage of the United Kingdom on 30 December 1812 for Aeneas Mackintosh. He was an author as well as Chief of Clan Mackintosh and Captain of Clan Chattan. The title became extinct on his death in 1820.

The Mackintosh Baronetcy, of Halifax in the County of York, was created in the Baronetage of the United Kingdom on 28 January 1935 for Harold Mackintosh. He was later raised to the peerage as Viscount Mackintosh of Halifax. See this title for more information.

Mackintosh baronets, of Mackintosh (1812)
Sir Aeneas Mackintosh, 1st Baronet (died 1820)

Mackintosh baronets, of Halifax (1935)
see Viscount Mackintosh of Halifax

References

Baronetcies in the Baronetage of the United Kingdom
Extinct baronetcies in the Baronetage of the United Kingdom